Paplin  is a village in the administrative district of Gmina Korytnica, within Węgrów County, Masovian Voivodeship, in east-central Poland.

The village has a population of 280.

References

Paplin